"Ye Gods" is the second segment of the fifth episode of the first season (1985–86) from the television series The Twilight Zone. In this segment, a man's disinterest in pursuing love draws the wrath of Cupid and forces him into dealings with the gods of ancient mythology.

Plot
Todd Ettinger accidentally runs into a woman at the cash register at a diner. Cupid throws magical dust over them and they fall in love. However, Todd ignores his feelings and heads to work. Cupid follows Todd to his office, identifies himself, and vents his frustration that humans have become so unsentimental that they can brush aside the experience of falling in love. Taking him for a nut, Todd tries to call someone to throw Cupid out of his office, but Cupid melts his phone and, in a pique of anger, shoots three love arrows into Todd's heart.

After work, Todd sees the woman again and gives chase but loses sight of her. He has a restless night, and realizes Cupid's arrows have trapped him into desperate love. Recalling that Cupid mentioned a conversation he had with Bacchus, he looks Bacchus up in a phone book and turns up at one of his parties, hoping he will find Cupid there. He tells Cupid that he was right and he now realizes he wants a meaningful relationship with a woman, and asks him to fix him up with the woman he is in love with. A drunk Cupid reveals his powers are at an ebb because he has fallen into despair over his own estranged love, a Fury named Megaera. Todd plans to get Cupid and Megaera back together, hoping then Cupid will help him.

Todd summons Megaera with an incantation he got from Bacchus. She rants about how she would never get back with Cupid because of his diddling with mortals. Todd calls Bacchus and arranges another meeting. Megaera and Cupid both show up at his office and he uses an incantation to keep them from leaving. Cupid apologizes to her and admits he was wrong. Megaera accepts his apology and they fall in love again. Todd leaves them alone in his office to make up. Later, he goes back in to find a letter that states they hitched a ride with the window washer. Todd is upset that he is left with unrequited love. Attempting to comfort himself with shopping, he buys a car. After pulling off the lot he is rear-ended–by the woman he was pining after. She tells Todd that she had been looking for him as well. Cupid and Megaera drive by, waving and smiling at Todd as he and the woman embrace.

External links
 

1985 American television episodes
The Twilight Zone (1985 TV series season 1) episodes
Classical mythology in popular culture

fr:L'Amour déçu de Cupidon